Samir Abdul Aziz al-Najim (born 1937  in Baghdad) was an Iraqi politician, who held several senior positions under President Saddam Hussein. He was the Minister for Oil from January to April 2003 and the President's chief of staff for several years after the 1991 Gulf War. He was the Iraqi Ambassador to Egypt, Turkey, Spain and Russia.

He was born in 1937 in Baghdad from a Sunni Arab background. al-Najim was the regional command chairman for the Arab Socialist Ba'ath Party for East Baghdad. He was accused by US Army officers of helping Saddam Hussein plot assassination attempts He was convicted in 1959 of the attempted assassination of Prime Minister Abd al-Karim Qasim and was sentenced to death, although Qassim pardoned Najim.

Following the invasion of Iraq by the United States and allied forces in 2003, he was depicted as the four of clubs in their deck of most-wanted Iraqi playing cards. His assets were frozen under United Nations Security Council Resolution 1483 as a "senior official" and transferred to the Development Fund for Iraq.

He was captured by Kurdish peshmerga near Mosul in April 2003. He is sitting in a prison located in Kadhimiya Region. He was sentenced to life imprisonment with a confiscation all possessed property and funds on October 26, 2016.

References 

Living people
Arab Socialist Ba'ath Party – Iraq Region politicians
Ambassadors of Iraq to Egypt
Ambassadors of Iraq to Turkey
Ambassadors of Iraq to Russia
Ambassadors of Iraq to Spain
Government ministers of Iraq
1930s births
People from Baghdad
Most-wanted Iraqi playing cards
Iraq War prisoners of war
Iraqi prisoners of war